Tin Men is a 1987 American comedy film written and directed by Barry Levinson, produced by Mark Johnson, and starring Richard Dreyfuss, Danny DeVito, and Barbara Hershey.

It is the second of Levinson's tetralogy "Baltimore Films", set in his hometown of Baltimore, Maryland, during the 1940s, 1950s, and 1960s: Diner (1982), Tin Men (1987), Avalon (1990), and Liberty Heights (1999).

Plot
Ernest Tilley and Bill "BB" Babowsky are rival door-to-door aluminum siding salesmen in Baltimore, Maryland in 1963, an era when "tin men," as they are called, will do almost anything—legal or illegal—to close a sale. BB is a smooth-talking con-artist who scams naive and comely young women with his sales pitches, while Tilley is a hapless loser.

They first meet when BB, driving his new Cadillac off the lot, backs into Tilley's own Cadillac. Though Tilley had the right of way, each man blames the other, and an escalating feud erupts between them.

After BB smashes Tilley's headlights and Tilley shatters BB's car windows in response, BB sets out to seduce Tilley's long-suffering wife Nora in revenge. Immediately after having sex with Nora, he calls Tilley to taunt him with the news. Tilley tells BB to keep Nora; he wants to be rid of her.

Meanwhile, both men have their own personal troubles. BB's older partner and mentor, Moe Adams, is hospitalized with a serious heart condition. Tilley has a gambling problem and squanders what little money he makes betting on horse races, causing a rift with Nora. He is in debt to various creditors and the IRS, which begins confiscating his possessions for unpaid property taxes. Exhausted by their rivalry, the two men decide to play a game of pool to decide who should get Nora in order to end to their personal war. BB loses, but he does not honor the bet. He has fallen in love for the first time, and Nora moves in with him.

The newly formed Maryland Home Improvement Commission is investigating corrupt sales practices in the home-improvement industry. Both men are subpoenaed, and after giving testimony about their sales practices, the commission takes away both of their licenses. While Tilley gives up his license reluctantly, BB does so willingly as part of his new outlook on life. BB, seeing that Tilley has lost everything, including his car, takes pity on him and gives him a ride. Together, the two freshly unemployed men begin sharing ideas for a new business they can create for themselves.

Cast
 Richard Dreyfuss as Bill "B.B." Babowsky
 Danny DeVito as Ernest Tilley
 Barbara Hershey as Nora Tilley
 John Mahoney as Moe Adams
 Jackie Gayle as Sam
 Stanley Brock as Gil
 Seymour Cassel as "Cheese"
 Bruno Kirby as "Mouse"
 J.T. Walsh as "Wing"
 Richard Portnow as Carly
 Matt Craven as "Looney"
 Alan Blumenfeld as Stanley
 Brad Sullivan as Masters
 Michael Tucker as "Bagel"
 Deirdre O'Connell as Nellie

Reception
Tin Men received positive reviews from critics, as the film holds a rating of 78% on Rotten Tomatoes, with an average rating of 7/10, based on 23 reviews.

Music
The group Fine Young Cannibals appears as the house band in a nightclub in the film and also contributed songs to the film's soundtrack.

See also

References

External links

 
 
 
 

1987 films
1987 comedy-drama films
American business films
American comedy-drama films
Films directed by Barry Levinson
Films set in 1963
Films set in Baltimore
Films set in the 1960s
Films shot in Baltimore
Touchstone Pictures films
1987 comedy films
1987 drama films
1980s English-language films
1980s American films